Lissachatina albopicta, common name the African land snail, is a species of large air-breathing land snail, a terrestrial pulmonate gastropod mollusk in the family Achatinidae. 

This species is native to Kenya.

References

External links
 Bequaert, J. C. (1950). Studies in the Achatininae, a group of African land snails. Bulletin of the Museum of Comparative Zoology. 105(1): 1-216, plates 1-81

Achatinidae
Gastropods described in 1878
Molluscs of Africa